Nathan Rutjes (born 1 December 1983) is a Dutch former professional footballer. He formerly played for Dutch clubs Sparta Rotterdam, MVV and Roda JC.

Club career
A midfielder, Rutjes was born in Rotterdam and made his debut in professional football, being part of the Sparta Rotterdam squad in the 2005–06 season. He is known for sporting a mullet, his optimism inside and outside the pitch, and his sportsmanship. He has been awarded various prizes for being an inspiring and exemplary athlete. He retired in 2019 as part of the amateur club RKSV Groene Ster.

Television and film

In 2020, he appeared in the twentieth season of the popular television show Wie is de Mol?. He appears in the 2022 film De Club van Sinterklaas en de Race Tegen de Klok. He also appears in the third season of the television show De Verraders.

References

External links
 Voetbal International profile 

1983 births
Living people
Dutch footballers
Sparta Rotterdam players
MVV Maastricht players
Roda JC Kerkrade players
Eredivisie players
Eerste Divisie players
Footballers from Rotterdam
Association football midfielders
RKSV Groene Ster players
21st-century Dutch people